Charpentieria dyodon is a species of small, very elongate, air-breathing land snail, terrestrial pulmonate gastropod mollusks in the family Clausiliidae, the door snails, all of which have a clausilium. This species is found in Italy and Switzerland.

References 

Charpentieria
Gastropods described in 1820
Molluscs of Europe
Taxonomy articles created by Polbot